Americanah is a 2013 novel by the Nigerian author Chimamanda Ngozi Adichie, for which Adichie won the 2013 U.S. National Book Critics Circle Award for fiction. Americanah tells the story of a young Nigerian woman, Ifemelu, who immigrates to the United States to attend university. The novel traces Ifemelu's life in both countries, threaded by her love story with high school classmate Obinze. It was Adichie's third novel, published on May 14, 2013 by Alfred A. Knopf. A television miniseries, starring and produced by Lupita Nyong'o, was in development for HBO Max, but then was later dropped.

Summary 
Americanah is about Ifemelu and Obinze who, as teenagers in a Lagos secondary school, fall in love. Nigeria at the time is under military dictatorship, and people are seeking to leave the country. Ifemelu moves to the United States to study, where she struggles for the first time with racism and the many varieties of racial distinctions: for the first time, Ifemelu discovers what it means to be a "Black Person". Obinze had hoped to join her in the U.S. but he is denied a visa after 9/11. He goes to London, eventually becoming an undocumented immigrant after his visa expires.

Years later, Obinze returns to Nigeria and becomes a wealthy man as a property developer in the newly democratic country. Ifemelu gains success in the United States, where she becomes known for her blog about race in America, entitled "Raceteenth or Various Observations About American Blacks (Those Formerly Known as Negroes) by a Non-American Black". When Ifemelu returns to Nigeria, the two consider reviving a relationship in light of their diverging experiences and identities during their many years apart.

Characters 

 Ifemelu – The protagonist. She is born in Lagos, Nigeria, and studies in America. 
 Obinze – Raised in Nsukka, Nigeria. His mother, a professor, taught him how to cook and fostered his love of books.
 Obinze's Mother – Professor at Nsukka University and a widow. She struggles with outdated Nigerian attitudes towards women.
 Ifemelu's Mother and Father – Ifemelu's mother is a devout evangelical Christian who fasts dangerously in order to drive the devil out of her family's life. Ifemelu's father is powerless to stop her. He unexpectedly loses his job at a federal agency and is unable to support his family.
 Aunty Uju – Ifemelu's father’s cousin. She acts as Ifemelu's older sister. She starts a relationship with the General, and gives birth to a son, Dike. After the General dies, Uju moves to America, where she struggles to continue the medical training she began in Nigeria.
 Dike – The son of Aunty Uju and the General. Born in the United States, he is named after Uju's father, and given her surname. After his birth, Dike and Uju return to Nigeria where his first birthday is spent; soon after, his father dies in a plane crash. Dike and Uju flee Nigeria to escape the poverty that would result from his father's relatives confiscate their resources. He lives first in New York, then Massachusetts. His suicide attempt devastates his family and underlines the difficulty immigrant families face when trying to integrate into American society.
 The General – Aunty Uju's lover and father of Dike.
 Curt – Ifemelu's first American boyfriend, white. 
 Blaine – Ifemelu's second American boyfriend, a black assistant professor at Yale who writes a blog about race and popular culture. Ifemelu moves to New Haven to live with him. 
 Shan – Blaine's sister, a writer who is often critical of others.
 Kosi – Obinze's wife and the mother of his child.
 Buchi – Obinze and Kosi's daughter.
 Ginika – Ifemelu's friend, whom she knew when she met Obinze.

Themes

Americanization 
Americanization is one of the most prominent themes in Americanah. In the context of the novel, America itself is a symbol of hope, wealth, social and economic mobility, and, ultimately, disappointment, as Ifemelu learns that the American Dream is a lie and that the advantages she enjoys there often come at a great price. Her Americanization is slow but distinct, and she gradually picks up the slang, adapts to her surroundings (for better or worse), and adopts American politics. Her views on gender and race change because of this, and her blog is devoted to exploring the issue of race as a non-American black in America. She's called Americanah when she returns to Nigeria, having picked up a blunt, American way of speaking and addressing problems. She resists this label, but it's evident to the reader that Ifemelu's years in America have changed her.

According to Idowu Faith, “no valid statement can be made on Americanah without deconstructing the term “Americanah” which, more or less, reveals the thesis of the narrative as well as the preoccupation of Adichie in the text.” In Nigerian parlance, the term “Americanah” is an identity term based on a person’s previous experience of living in America. In an interview, Adichie defines Americanah as describing those who have been to the US and return with American affectations, pretend not to understand their mother tongues any longer, and refuse to eat Nigerian food, making constant reference to their life in America.

From this understanding, it is clear that Ifemelu’s decision to return home without worrying about being identified as an “Americanah” establishes that Adichie is proposing and charting a path for a new kind of migration story whose quintessence is return migration.

Gender 
Adichie's explorations of sexual education and the perception of sex among youngsters in Nigeria plays a fundamental role in the journey of Ifemelu exploring her sexuality as an adolescent in a puritan post-colonial society.

Migration 
While many of the migratory experiences in the novel work within migration theory, Adichie simultaneously transcends the borders of international migration theories by introducing a new factor that both influences migration and projects a new perspective on return migration. According to Dustmann and Weiss (2007:237), lack of economic opportunity and escape from natural disaster/persecution are two main reasons individuals migrate throughout history. While identifying the need to flee “choicelessness” as the main reason for much of the migration in the twenty-first century Nigerian setting of the novel, Adichie uses literary dimensions to shake up the foundations of theory. Consequently, the direction of this type of migration, how it affects the bonds of love, how it changes personalities and cultural views, and how it reinterprets identity become the novelist’s major theoretical engagements. In addition, Adichie is concerned with how migration debases and elevates, how it barters and fulfills and, most significantly, how it reinvents.

Reception

Reviews
Critics praised the novel, especially noting its range across different societies and reflection of global tensions. Writing for The New York Times, Mike Peed said, "'Americanah' examines blackness in America, Nigeria and Britain, but it's also a steady-handed dissection of the universal human experience—a platitude made fresh by the accuracy of Adichie's observations." Peed concluded, "'Americanah' is witheringly trenchant and hugely empathetic, both worldly and geographically precise, a novel that holds the discomfiting realities of our times fearlessly before us. It never feels false."  Reviewing the novel for The Washington Post, Emily Raboteau called Adichie "a hawkeyed observer of manners and distinctions in class," and said Adichie brings a "ruthless honesty about the ugly and beautiful sides of both" the United States and Nigeria. In the Chicago Tribune, Laura Pearson wrote, "Sprawling, ambitious and gorgeously written, 'Americanah' covers race, identity, relationships, community, politics, privilege, language, hair, ethnocentrism, migration, intimacy, estrangement, blogging, books and Barack Obama. It covers three continents, spans decades, leaps gracefully, from chapter to chapter, to different cities and other lives...[Adichie] weaves them assuredly into a thoughtfully structured epic. The result is a timeless love story steeped in our times." Tshilidzi Marwala links the Americanah to the rise of nationalism. In this regard, he thinks the story of Americanah evokes the image that the 21st century will be defined by the dialectical tension between the globalization, which is brought by technology, and the "othering" which is brought by the alienating characteristic of globalization. Accordingly, Marwala on reviewing Americanah states that "it seems that in the 21st century, the strangeness of othering, of enhancing difference rather than embracing our commonalities and the wedging of deep fissures in society continues unabated."

Awards
The book was selected as one of the 10 Best Books of 2013 by the editors of the New York Times Book Review. It won the 2013 National Book Critics Circle Award (Fiction), and was shortlisted for the 2014 Baileys Women's Prize for Fiction of the United Kingdom. The Chicago Tribune awarded Adichie its 2013 Heartland Award for Fiction, "recogniz[ing Americanah as] a novel that engages with important ideas about race, and does so with style, wit and insight."

In March 2017, Americanah was picked as the winner for the "One Book, One New York" program, part of a community reading initiative encouraging all city residents to read the same book.

Sales
Americanah spent 78 weeks on NPR's Paperback Best-Seller list. Days after The New York Times named Americanah to its best books of 2013 list, Beyoncé also signaled her admiration of Adichie, sampling Adichie's TED Talk "We should all be feminists" on the song "***Flawless"; sales of Americanah soared and as of December 23, 2013, the book climbed to the number 179 spot on Amazon.com's list of its 10,000 best-selling books.

Adaptations 
In 2014, it was announced that David Oyelowo and Lupita Nyong'o would star in a film adaptation of the novel, to be produced by Brad Pitt and his production company Plan B. In 2018, Nyong'o told The Hollywood Reporter that she was developing a television miniseries based on the book, which she would produce and star in. It was announced on September 13, 2019, that HBO Max would air the miniseries in ten episodes, with actor and playwright Danai Gurira as writer and showrunner. On October 15, 2020, it was reported that the miniseries would not move forward due to scheduling conflicts.

Scholarly works related to Americanah
Ojo, Akinleye Ayinuola.  Discursive Construction of Sexuality and Sexual Orientations in Chimamanda Adichie's Americanah. Ibadan Journal of English Studies 7 (2018): 543-560-224.

References

External links

 Americanah at Chimamanda Ngozi Adichie's site

2013 Nigerian novels
Igbo-American history
Nigerian English-language novels
Alfred A. Knopf books
Novels by Chimamanda Ngozi Adichie
Novels set in the United States
Novels set in Lagos
Novels set in Baltimore
Novels set in London
Fiction about emigration
Nigerian-American novels
Bureaucracy in fiction
Novels about racism
National Book Critics Circle Award-winning works